Spirula spirula is a species of deep-water squid-like cephalopod mollusk. It is the only extant member of the genus Spirula, the family Spirulidae, and the order Spirulida. Because of the shape of its internal shell, it is commonly known as the ram's horn squid or the little post horn squid. Because the live animal has a light-emitting organ, it is also sometimes known as the tail-light squid.

Live specimens of this cephalopod are very rarely seen because it is a deep-ocean dweller. The small internal shell of the species is, however, quite a familiar object to many beachcombers. The shell of Spirula is extremely light in weight, very buoyant, and surprisingly durable; it very commonly floats ashore onto tropical beaches (and sometimes even temperate beaches) all over the world. This seashell is known to shell collectors as the ram's horn shell or simply as Spirula.

Description 
S. spirula has a squid-like body between 35 mm and 45 mm long. It is a decapod, with eight arms and two longer tentacles, all with suckers. The arms and tentacles can all be withdrawn completely into the mantle.

The species lacks a radula (or, at most, has a vestigial radula).

Shell
The most distinctive feature of this species is its buoyancy organ, an internal, chambered, endogastrically coiled shell in the shape of an open planispiral (a flat spiral wherein the coils do not touch each other), and consisting of two prismatic layers. The shell functions to osmotically control buoyancy.
Another trait is that it is mineralized, a feature only seen in cuttlefish and the nautilus amongst extant species.

The siphuncle is marginal, on the inner surface of the spiral.

Behaviour 

S. spirula is capable of emitting a green light from a photophore located at the tip of its mantle, between the ear-shaped fins.
Evidently this seems as a counter-illumination strategy, as in situ observations have captured footage of animals in a vertical stance, with photophore pointing downward and head up.

Habitat and distribution 

By day, Spirula lives in the deep oceans, reaching depths of 1,000 m. At night, it rises to 100–300 m.
Its preferred temperature is around 10 °C, and it tends to live around oceanic islands, near the continental shelf.

Most sources cite this species as tropical and they are observed to be plentiful in the subtropical seas around the Canary Islands. Shells are regularly found along the western coasts of South Africa. In 2022, records of the species have also been confirmed in the Arabian Sea. However, significant quantities of shells from dead spirula are washed ashore even in temperate regions, such as coasts of New Zealand. Because of the great buoyancy of the shells, these may possibly have been carried long distances by ocean currents.

Much of the organism's life history has not been observed; for instance, they are thought to spawn in winter in deeper water, yet no spawnlings have been directly seen. They must occasionally venture into the upper 10 m of the sea, for they are sometimes found in albatross guts.

The species was observed for the first time in its natural habitat in 2020, when an ROV of the Schmidt Ocean Institute recorded it in the depths near the northern Great Barrier Reef.

Evolutionary relationships
The order Spirulida also contains two extinct suborders: Groenlandibelina (including extinct families Groenlandibelidae and Adygeyidae), and Belopterina (including extinct families Belemnoseidae and Belopteridae).

Spirula is likely the closest living relative of the extinct belemnites and aulacocerids. These three groups as a unit are closely related to the cuttlefish, as well as to the true squids.

See also
 Jellyella

References

External links
 
 

Cephalopod genera
Monotypic mollusc genera
Cenozoic cephalopods
Miocene molluscs
Pliocene molluscs
Extant Miocene first appearances
Taxa named by Jean-Baptiste Lamarck
Molluscs described in 1758
Taxa named by Carl Linnaeus
Bioluminescent molluscs